The Scout and Guide movement in Tanzania is served by:
 The Tanzania Girl Guides Association, member of the World Association of Girl Guides and Girl Scouts
 Tanzania Scouts Association, member of the World Organization of the Scout Movement

See also